The Atlantic spiny rats are all found in the genus Trinomys. They are a group of South American spiny-rats in the family Echimyidae.

Extant species of Trinomys

Based on Natureserve. 
     

The species of spiny rats in the genus Trinomys are apparently all Brazilian. In particular many of them are endemic to the Atlantic Forest of southeastern Brazil. Not much is known for certain about their ranges however, which still are being investigated, with frequent extensions to the recorded distributions of several species in various ecological classes of forest and dry land.  They do not however appear to occur at high altitudes, and several of their ranges appear to be parapatric. Most species of Trinomys are terrestrial and ambulatory, though Trinomys yonenagae is unusual that it is semi-fossorial, living in colonial burrows, and exhibits incipient specializations for saltatorial locomotion.

Phylogeny

Genus level
Trinomys is the sister genus to the fossorial genera Clyomys and Euryzygomatomys.
In turn, these three genera — forming the clade of Euryzygomatomyinae — share phylogenetic affinities with a clade containing Carterodon and members of the family Capromyidae.

References

Trinomys
Rodent genera
Taxa named by Oldfield Thomas